Siragusa is a surname. Notable people with the surname include:

Charles J. Siragusa (born 1947), American judge
Elisa Siragusa (born 1986), Italian politician
Irene Siragusa (born 1993), Italian sprinter
Kaitlyn Siragusa or Amouranth (born 1993), American cosplayer and streamer
Nico Siragusa (born 1994), American football player
Stefano Siragusa (born 1976), Italian businessman
Tony Siragusa (1967–2022), American football player